The East Siberian grayling (Thymallus pallasii) is a grayling in the salmon family Salmonidae.

Distribution
The East Siberian grayling was first described from the Kolyma River basin by Peter Simon Pallas. Its distribution range is still insufficiently specified, but it usually includes the rivers flowing to the Arctic coast eastward from the Khatanga River, across the East Siberian Plain, and further east to easternmost Siberia, including the rivers in the Chukotka Peninsula as well as rivers of the Sea of Okhotsk basin, such as the Ola River in the Magadan Oblast and the Kukhtuy in Khabarovsk Krai.

See also
List of freshwater fish of Russia

References

Thymallus
Fish described in 1848